St. Gertrude Old Church is a Lutheran church in Riga, the capital of Latvia. It is a parish church of the Evangelical Lutheran Church of Latvia. The church is situated at the address 6 Ģertrūdes Street. It has a long association with Riga's German ethnic community, and the congregation worship in the German language.

Location
The church is located in a suburb of Riga, historically outside the main city walls, and thus unprotected in times of war or siege.

History
Seven St Gertrude's churches have stood on or near the current location. The first (age unknown, but in existence by 1418) was built of stone, but later demolished. From 1589 to 1591 it was rebuilt. It was again destroyed in 1605 by the Swedish army laying siege to Riga in that year. The rebuilt church was not damaged in the Russian siege of Riga (1656), although its bells and organ were stolen and taken to Russia. In 1700 the church was again destroyed, as part of the fighting of the Great Northern War. From 1743 to 1744 the church was rebuilt, in wood. From 1753 to 1754 the church was again rebuilt, in order to enlarge it, and it was again furnished with bells and an organ. Further expansion led to a rebuilding from 1778 to 1779, and a shift of location back to the exact site of the original stone church. Application was made to build in stone, but was refused by the city council (stone structures were permitted only inside the city walls), so another wooden church was built. This building was destroyed in the French invasion of 1812. The church was rebuilt from 1814 to 1817. Finally from 1866 to 1869 the present stone and brick church was constructed to replace the wooden building.

Second St Gertrude's church
By the start of the twentieth century St Gertrude's recorded more than 30,000 church members, meeting as three distinct congregations. A German congregation and a Latvian congregation alternated their services between Sunday morning and Sunday afternoons, and a second Latvian congregation worshipped on Sunday evenings. From 1903 to 1906 a second church was built, now known as St. Gertrude New Church, and this became the centre of the Latvian congregations, leaving Old St Gertrude's as the German-speaking church for Riga.

Gallery

References 

Churches in Riga